IRIS GL (Integrated Raster Imaging System Graphics Library) is a proprietary graphics API created by Silicon Graphics (SGI) in the early 1980s for producing 2D and 3D computer graphics on their IRIX-based IRIS graphical workstations. Later SGI removed their proprietary code, reworked various system calls, and released IRIS GL as the industry standard OpenGL.

See also
 Silicon Graphics Image for file extension .iris
 SGI IRIS
 IrisVision - first port to PCs

References

External links 
 Official OpenGL website
 SGI's OpenGL website

3D graphics software
Application programming interfaces
Graphics libraries
Graphics standards
SGI graphics
Video game development software